Nicholas Drake (born December 22, 1995) is an American professional stock car racing driver. He has competed in the NASCAR Camping World Truck Series and K&N Pro Series East as a development driver for JR Motorsports.

Racing career

K&N Pro Series West
Drake ran two races in the K&N Pro Series West in 2014 with Bill McAnally Racing, both at Phoenix International Raceway. After finishing third his first time around, he started from the pole and won in his second race.

K&N Pro Series East

Camping World Truck Series
Drake, a former Haas Racing development driver, debuted in 2016, driving JR Motorsports' No. 49 entry at Dover International Speedway. He qualified fourteenth and finished on the lead lap in sixteenth. Three races later at Iowa Speedway, Drake qualified in the top ten but fell to a twenty-third-place finish, three laps off the pace. His teammate for those two races was Cole Custer, who Drake had raced with in the K&N Pro Series East.

Motorsports career results

NASCAR
(key) (Bold – Pole position awarded by qualifying time. Italics – Pole position earned by points standings or practice time. * – Most laps led. ** – All laps led.)

Camping World Truck Series

K&N Pro Series East

K&N Pro Series West

 Season still in progress
 Ineligible for series points

References

External links
 

1995 births
Living people
Racing drivers from North Carolina
People from Mooresville, North Carolina
NASCAR drivers
World of Outlaws drivers
JR Motorsports drivers